Van der Watt is an Afrikaans and Dutch surname. Notable people with the surname include:

Jan van der Watt (born 1952), South African academic
Niel van der Watt (born 1962), South African composer

Afrikaans-language surnames
Dutch-language surnames